The 2019 Kent State Golden Flashes football team represented Kent State University in the 2019 NCAA Division I FBS football season. They were led by second year head coach Sean Lewis and played their home games at Dix Stadium in Kent, Ohio, as members of the East Division of the Mid-American Conference.

Trailing 6–27 in the fourth quarter against Buffalo with a 3–6 record, Kent State proceeded to score 24 unanswered points in the last eight minutes of the game to win 30–27, and later followed that victory with two additional wins to reach bowl eligibility for the first time since 2012. Kent State were then invited to the Frisco Bowl where they defeated Utah State with a 51–41 score.

Previous season
The Golden Flashes finished the 2018 season 2–10 1–7 in MAC Play to finish in last place in the East Division for the second year in a row.

Preseason

MAC media poll
The MAC released their preseason media poll on July 23, 2019, with the Golden Flashes predicted to finish in fourth place in the East Division.

Schedule

Source:

Game summaries

at Arizona State

Kennesaw State

at No. 8 Auburn

Bowling Green

at No. 8 Wisconsin

at Akron

at Ohio

Miami (OH)

at Toledo

Buffalo

Ball State

at Eastern Michigan

vs. Utah State (Frisco Bowl)

References

Kent State
Kent State Golden Flashes football seasons
Frisco Bowl champion seasons
Kent State Golden Flashes football